Ridge Township, Ohio, may refer to:

Ridge Township, Van Wert County, Ohio
Ridge Township, Wyandot County, Ohio

Ohio township disambiguation pages